Ghoman/Ghuman is a village in Gurdaspur district of Punjab, India. A shrine there is dedicated to Namdev, a Bhakti saint, and is believed by the villagers to represent the place where he was cremated after his travels from Maharashtra. The tradition, which also says that he spent the last 20 years of his life in that village, is not universally accepted. The village is now famous as a town due to substantial business expansion. Ghoman is also famous for  presence of Radhasoami population. 

Location

Nearby village is Dakoha

Click for location on Google maps: Ghoman.

Notable people 
 Baba Jaimal Singh Ji Maharaj - Founder and first Satguru of Radha Soami Satsang Beas.

References

Villages in Gurdaspur district